Mavka is a type of female spirit in Ukrainian folklore and mythology. The Mavka is a long-haired figure, sometimes naked, typically depicted as temptress figures who lure men to their deaths.

Terminology 
However, depending on telling, there are differences between the Mavka and Nyavka.

Folklore 
The spirits known by this term represented the souls of girls who had died unnatural tragic or premature deaths, particularly unchristened babies. s often appear in the form of beautiful young girls who entice and lure young men into the woods, where they "tickled" them to death. s have no reflection in water, nor do they cast shadows. In some accounts, they were also said to help farmers by looking after cattle and driving out wild animals. 

Nyavka has "no back", meaning that their insides can be seen. It is one of the primary distinctions between the Mavka and the Nyavka.

They were believed to live in groups in forests, mountain caves, or sheds, which they decorated with rugs. They made thread of stolen flax and wove thin transparent cloth for making clothes for themselves. They loved flowers, which they wore in their hair. In the spring they planted flowers in the mountains, to which they enticed young men, whom they tickled to death. On Pentecost (known as 's Easter) they held games, dances, and orgies. A demon accompanied them on a flute or pipes. 

To save an unchristened baby's soul, one must throw up a kerchief during Pentecost holidays, say their name and add "I baptise you". The rescued soul would then go to heaven.

Popular culture 
s are depicted in literature, most notably in Lesia Ukrainka's The Forest Song and nyavkas are depicted in Mykhailo Kotsiubynsky's Shadows of Forgotten Ancestors. In modern culture the  image is developed and narrated by a Ukrainian music band Mavka. and the movie Mavka. The song of the forest. 

In addition, on January 12, 2022, the Ukrainian singer Eria released the song "Mavka", which deals with s and made Mavka famous especially among Ukrainian Eurovision fans.

See also

Notes

References

Citations

Works cited

External links 
 "Mavka" — Internet Encyclopedia of Ukraine
 "Kostroma" — Encyclopedia of Mythology 

Deities and spirits
Female legendary creatures
Ghosts
Nav'
Nudity in mythology
Pentecost
Slavic culture
Slavic legendary creatures
Slavic paganism
Supernatural legends
Ukrainian mythology
Undead
Demonology
Ukrainian culture